Speden Bench is a bench (c.45 m) on the west side of White Island, 1 nautical mile (1.9 km) from the north end, in Ross Archipelago. The bench comprises the NW-most moraine-covered volcanic outcrops on the island, upon which occur tuffaceous conglomerate block and shell fragments of the Scallop Hill Formation. Named by Advisory Committee on Antarctic Names (US-ACAN) (1999) after Ian Gordon Speden, New Zealand Geological Survey, DSIR, who, accompanied by A.C. Beck, collected fossiliferous deposits here, December 22, 1958.

Terraces of Antarctica
Landforms of the Ross Dependency
White Island (Ross Archipelago)